Admiral Sir Thomas Brandreth,  (6 August 1825 – 10 December 1894) was a Royal Navy officer who went on to be Third Naval Lord and Controller of the Navy.

Naval career

Brandreth was educated at Eton like his father Thomas and entered the Royal Navy in 1838. He was appointed a Lieutenant in the Royal Navy in 1845. Promoted to Captain in 1863, he was given command of HMS Edgar and then HMS Lord Warden. He was appointed Captain of the gunnery school HMS Excellent in 1874, Captain Superintendent of Sheerness Dockyard in 1877, Superintendent of Chatham Dockyard in 1879 and Third Naval Lord and Controller of the Navy in 1882. He went on to be President of the Royal Naval College, Greenwich in 1885, before he retired in 1890.

References

External links
 

|-

1825 births
1894 deaths
Admiral presidents of the Royal Naval College, Greenwich
Royal Navy admirals
Knights Commander of the Order of the Bath
Lords of the Admiralty